João Urbano (born 30 July 1985) is a Portuguese racing driver.

Career 

In 2005, Urbano participated in the Formula BMW World Final with ASL Team Mücke Motorsport but did not finish.

For the first A1 Grand Prix season, in 2005-06, Urbano was a practice driver for the A1 Team Portugal and take part to the race since the 2006-07 season, having lost his seat to Filipe Albuquerque.

Career results

External links 
 A1GP statistics at results.a1gp.com
 Career statistics at driverdb.com

References 

1985 births
Portuguese racing drivers
Living people
A1 Team Portugal drivers
Formula BMW ADAC drivers
Formula BMW UK drivers
Sportspeople from Lisbon
Prema Powerteam drivers
A1 Grand Prix drivers
Formula 3 Euro Series drivers
Mücke Motorsport drivers
Carlin racing drivers
Team Astromega drivers